Federico Raúl Laurito (born 18 May 1990) is an Argentine professional footballer.

External links
 Gazzetta profile
 Primera División statistics
 Federico Laurito at Soccerway

1990 births
Living people
Argentine footballers
Argentina youth international footballers
Argentina under-20 international footballers
Argentine expatriate footballers
Argentine Primera División players
Primera B de Chile players
Serie B players
Ecuadorian Serie A players
Categoría Primera A players
Newell's Old Boys footballers
Udinese Calcio players
U.S. Livorno 1915 players
Venezia F.C. players
Club Atlético Huracán footballers
C.D. Cuenca footballers
Everton de Viña del Mar footballers
Barcelona S.C. footballers
Arsenal de Sarandí footballers
Fuerza Amarilla S.C. footballers
L.D.U. Portoviejo footballers
Independiente Medellín footballers
Association football forwards
Footballers from Rosario, Santa Fe
Expatriate footballers in Chile
Expatriate footballers in Italy
Expatriate footballers in Ecuador
Expatriate footballers in Colombia
Argentine expatriate sportspeople in Chile
Argentine expatriate sportspeople in Italy
Argentine expatriate sportspeople in Ecuador
Argentine expatriate sportspeople in Colombia